Cyrus Fernandez, who also uses the pseudonyms Cyrus The Virus, Castor, and (formerly) Chase, is a musician, artist manager, event producer, writer, and popular radio personality from the Philippines best known for being one of the rock jocks who consisted the last lineup of Manila's now-defunct rock radio station NU 107, and for being one of the former NU 107 jocks making an effort to recreate NU 107's programming using the internet instead of traditional radio.

He served as lead vocalist of the Filipino Rock/Power Metal band Exillion  until the band went on hiatus in 2010. He is still involved in bands albeit not in the front lines, having taken on the responsibility of being an artist agent.  He currently works with bands Giniling Festival, Segatron, and Game Theory. He founded Audio Heavy Productions in 2010.

A native of Los Baños, Laguna, Fernandez received a bachelor's degree in Development Communication with a major in broadcasting from the College of Development Communication at the University of the Philippines Los Banos.  It was here that Fernandez first became a DJ, serving as a jock for 97.4 DZLB FM, taking on the pseudonym "Chase."

Musician wunderkind Sega Alcabasa formed the band Exillion in 2009, and decided to recruit Fernandez as front man for the band because Alcabasa thought his high-noted singing would be most apt for the band's sound.

He currently writes music-related articles for news websites, and is part of Dig Radio, an online radio station put up by former NU 107 jocks.

References

Filipino radio personalities
21st-century Filipino male singers
Living people
People from Los Baños, Laguna
Musicians from Laguna (province)
University of the Philippines Los Baños alumni
Year of birth missing (living people)